Koninklijke Sportkring Heist is a professional Belgian association football club from Heist-op-den-Berg in the province of Antwerp. They are affiliated to the Royal Belgian Football Association with matricule 2948 and have white and blue as traditional colours. The club plays at the Gemeentelijk Sportcentrum and is currently in the Second Division. Heist spent nine seasons at the third level of Belgian football, from 1987 to 1988 to 1993–94, and from 2008 to 2009 to 2009–10.

History
The club was founded as F.C. Heist-Sportief in September 1940 . In January 1941, the team played in the Flemish Association, not part of the Belgian Football Association, but a different competitive amateur football league. In the spring of 1941 they moved to the Belgian Football Association, where they were awarded matriculation number 2948. Since then, it received the royal prefix Koninklijke in 1990, and in July 1995 it merged with K.S.V. Heist-op-den-Berg to become the professional club it is today K.S.K. Heist.

Stadium
K.S.K Heist play their home games at Gemeentelijk Sportcentrum in Heist-op-den-Berg. The Stadium has a capacity of 3,500, and home games are well attended throughout the season, with larger crowds expected for the local rivalry games against KVC Westerlo and KV Mechelen.

Current squad
As of 14 January 2022.

External links
Official website

Heist
Association football clubs established in 1940
1940 establishments in Belgium
Sport in Heist-op-den-Berg